The following is a list of Malayalam films released in the year 1991.

Dubbed films

References

 1991
1991
Malayalam
 Mal
1991 in Indian cinema